"Superthug" is a song by New York City rapper N.O.R.E. (a.k.a. Noreaga) with background vocals from Tammy Lucas during the song's hook. It was released as the second single from his debut solo album, N.O.R.E.. At the time, it became Noreaga's highest charting and most successful single, peaking at No. 36 on the Billboard Hot 100 and reaching No. 1 on the Hot Rap Songs chart. However it was later surpassed by his 2002 single "Nothin'" which peaked at #10 on the Billboard Hot 100.

Along with Mase's "Lookin' at Me", the single was one of the first high-profile productions done by Virginia production team the Neptunes. It made the Neptunes well known and sought after producers in the music industry, and in the first decade of the 21st century they would become one of the most successful production teams in music history, being named the Billboard magazine Producer of the Decade for the 2000s.

"Superthug" would later be sampled on Janet Jackson's "Ruff (I Like It)", recorded for her Damita Jo album which failed to make the cut, although a snippet was leaked to the Internet in 2010. Jackson also considered including the song on her Discipline album.

Charts

Weekly charts

Year-end charts

Compilation appearances

''All That "Hip Hop" (2005)

References

1998 singles
1998 songs
N.O.R.E. songs
Song recordings produced by the Neptunes
Tommy Boy Records singles
Songs written by N.O.R.E.